Joseph Little Bristow (July 22, 1861July 14, 1944) was a Republican politician from the American state of Kansas. Elected in 1908, Bristow served a single term in the United States Senate where he gained recognition for his support of a number of political causes of the Progressive era. Following his electoral defeat in the election of November 1914, Bristow spent the rest of his life as a farmer in the state of Virginia.

Bristow was a bit player in a legendary episode in American political folklore when his Senate speech on "what the country needs" is said to have moved a bored Vice President of the United States Thomas R. Marshall to lean forward and stage whisper: "What this country really needs is a good five-cent cigar."

Biography

Early years

Joseph Little Bristow was born in rural Wolfe County, Kentucky, just outside the hamlet of Hazel Green, on July 22, 1861. His father was the son of a Methodist minister who had become a school teacher who later fought in the American Civil War on behalf of the Union Army. The family was devoutly religious.

In November 1879, Bristow married Margaret A. Hendrix of Fleming County, Kentucky. Soon after marriage, the couple moved west to Elk County, Kansas to make a new life there in farming. This agrarian interlude was brief as in 1882 the Bristows moved to Baldwin, Kansas so that Joseph could enroll at Baker University, with a view to becoming a Methodist minister.

Bristow's political career began while still a student, when in conjunction with the election of 1884 he organized a Blaine and Logan club on behalf of the nominees for President and Vice President of the Republican Party.

He graduated from Baker University when he was 25.

Bristow edited several newspapers in Salina, Kansas before serving as a private secretary to Governor Edmund Morrill. He was President William McKinley's fourth assistant postmaster general.

United States Senator

Bristow was elected to the U.S. Senate in 1908 and served from 1909 to 1915.

As a Senator, Bristow fought fiercely for direct election of Senators, which, until the passage of the Seventeenth Amendment in 1912, were elected by (or appointed by processes established by) state legislatures.

Bristow is also known for giving young Dwight D. Eisenhower his nomination for entrance into the United States Military Academy.

Bristow was defeated in his 1914 re-election bid.

"What this country needs..."

Bristow is said to have played a part in provoking a sarcastic comment from Vice President Thomas R. Marshall. One day while Bristow was delivering a lengthy speech in the Senate on "what this country needs," Marshall leaned forward and whispered loudly enough for most of the chamber to hear, "What this country really needs is a good five-cent cigar."<ref>Charles M. Thomas, Thomas Riley Marshall: Hoosier Statesman. Oxford, OH: Mississippi Valley Press, 1939; pp. 174-175.</ref> The expression was immortalized with the retelling and has become a lasting part of American political folklore.

Later years

Bristow spent the rest of his life after politics farming his Virginia estate, Ossian Hall.

Death and legacy

Joseph L. Bristow died on July 14, 1944. His body was returned to Kansas for burial next to his wife Margaret in Salina's Gypsum Hill Cemetery.

Bristow is the namesake of the community of Bristow, Missouri.

Bristow is also the namesake of the community of Bristow, OK

Footnotes

Further reading

  Sageser, A. Bower. "Joseph L. Bristow: The Editor's Road to Politics" Kansas Historical Quarterly'' (1964) 30#2 pp.153-162.

External links

 

1861 births
1944 deaths
Baker University alumni
Kansas Republicans
Republican Party United States senators from Kansas
Virginia Republicans
People from Wolfe County, Kentucky
People from Baldwin City, Kansas
Progressivism in the United States